Hendford may refer to:

 Hendford railway station
 West Hendford Cricket Ground

See also 

 Hennffordd, Welsh name for Hereford
Headford
 Herford